The girls' 50 metre butterfly event at the 2018 Summer Youth Olympics took place on 9 and 10 October at the Natatorium in Buenos Aires, Argentina.

Results

Heats
The heats were started on 9 October at 10:22.

Swim-off
The swim-off was held on 9 October at 11:31.

Semifinals
The semifinals were started on 9 October at 18:13.

Final

The final was held on 10 October at 18:29.

References

Swimming at the 2018 Summer Youth Olympics